Jalan Chenor (Pahang state route C23) is a major road in Pahang, Malaysia.

List of junctions

Roads in Pahang